Chinese Taipei Athletics Association (CTAA) is a World Athletics-recognised member officially representing Taiwan. The current president is Yeh Chen-yen, and the General Secretary is Wang Ching-cheng. The office is based in the building of Taiwan Sports Administration in Taipei City.

References
 World Athletics Member Federation
 New Taipei City Wan Jin Shi Marathon became the first World Athletics Bronze Label Road Race in Taiwan

External links

  
  

National members of the Asian Athletics Association
Athletics in Taiwan
Athletics